Kailashia is a genus of flowering plants belonging to the family Apiaceae.

Its native range is Tibet to Western Himalaya.

Species:
Kailashia robusta 
Kailashia xizangensis

References

Apioideae
Apioideae genera